Plasmodium papernai is a parasite of the genus Plasmodium subgenus Novyella. As in all Plasmodium species, P. papernai has both vertebrate and insect hosts. The vertebrate hosts for this parasite are birds.

Taxonomy 
The parasite was first described by Grès and Landau in 1997.

References 

papernai
Parasites of birds